Kyle Turner (born 20 February 1992) is an Australian professional rugby league footballer who most recently played as a , , and  for the South Sydney Rabbitohs in the NRL. 

He played for the Indigenous All Stars and Country NSW, and he played in the Rabbitohs' 2014 NRL Grand Final winning team.

Background
Born in Sydney, New South Wales, Turner is of Indigenous Australian descent and played his junior rugby league for the Coonabarabran Unicorns, before being signed by the South Sydney Rabbitohs. As a youngster, he played for the New South Wales Indigenous Under-16s team. In 2011 and 2012, Turner played for the South Sydney Rabbitohs' NYC team before moving on to the Rabbitohs' New South Wales Cup team, North Sydney Bears in 2013. On 1 March 2013, Turner re-signed with the Rabbitohs on a 2-year contract to the end of the 2015 season.

Playing career

2014
In round 3 of the 2014 NRL season, Turner made his NRL debut for Souths against the Wests Tigers, playing off the interchange bench in South Sydney's 16-25 loss at ANZ Stadium. In round 6 against the Penrith Panthers, he scored his first NRL career try in South Sydney's 18-2 win at Penrith Stadium. On 5 October, he played off the interchange bench in South Sydney's 2014 NRL Grand Final win over the Canterbury-Bankstown Bulldogs. He finished the 2014 season having playing 25 matches and scoring six tries.

2015
On 31 January and 1 February, Turner played for Souths in their winning 2015 NRL Auckland Nines campaign. On 13 February, he played for the Indigenous All Stars against the NRL All Stars in the 2015 All Stars match. During the game, he seriously injured his neck after being tackled by Paul Gallen. 

Turner was sidelined for the first 20 rounds of the 2015 NRL season, before returning in round 21 against the Penrith Panthers, playing off the interchange bench. During the game, he was concussed in a tackle and taken off the field for the remainder of the game in Souths 20-16 win at ANZ Stadium. He finished the 2015 season having played in 6 matches for Souths. On 8 October, he re-signed with Souths on a 2-year contract.

2016
In February, Turner played for Souths in the 2016 NRL Auckland Nines. He finished the season playing in 23 matches, scoring 3 tries.

2017
Turner made 21 appearances for Souths in the 2017 NRL season scoring 1 try. Turner was selected in the last City vs Country Origin, starting at second-row and play for Country League in the 20-10 loss over to the City New South Wales Rugby League team at Glen Willow Regional Sports Stadium.

2018
Turner only made one appearance for Souths in the 2018 season coming off the bench in their 26-14 victory over arch rivals Eastern Suburbs.  Turner spent the remainder of the season playing in reserve grade for the North Sydney Bears.

2019
Under new coach Wayne Bennett, Turner made a return to the first grade team and made 16 appearances for Souths during the 2019 regular season as the club finished third on the table.  On 10 September, it was revealed that Turner was being released by Souths at the end of the season due to salary cap constraints.

2020
Following his rejection of an offer from the Queanbeyan Kangaroos  Turner retired for rugby league and returned to his hometown of Coonabarabran.

2021
In 2021, he made a surprise comeback with the Coonabarabran Unicorns. He is also now a physical education teacher at the local high school; the same school he formerly attended.

References

External links
South Sydney Rabbitohs profile
Rabbitohs profile

1992 births
Australian rugby league players
Indigenous Australian rugby league players
Indigenous All Stars players
Country New South Wales Origin rugby league team players
South Sydney Rabbitohs players
North Sydney Bears NSW Cup players
Rugby league second-rows
Rugby league locks
Rugby league centres
Rugby league players from Sydney
Living people